Marijan Zovko (born 21 August 1959 in Split) is a Croatian retired footballer and a current football manager.

Playing career
He started his senior career playing in his hometown Yugoslav First League club HNK Hajduk Split where he will win the 1978–79 national Championship. In 1980, he moved to another top league club, FK Vojvodina where he played most of his career, becoming the team captain and, there too, winning the national title, in the 1988–89 season. In nine years there, between official and other, he played 461 matches, scoring 132 goals
, an impressive record for a defender. In October 1988 (1988–1989 season) he decides to move abroad, more precisely, to Belgian First Division club Lierse S.K. where he will stay until 1991. He plays there 63 games and scored 9 goals.

He played for Yugoslavia national under-21 football team.

Managerial career
After finishing his playing career, he became a football manager, coaching many clubs mainly in the Croatian and Bosnian top leagues.

Honours
Hajduk Split
Yugoslav First League: 1978–79
Vojvodina
Yugoslav First League: 1988–89

References

External links
 
 Player story in Vojvodina official website.

1959 births
Living people
Footballers from Split, Croatia
Association football central defenders
Yugoslav footballers
Yugoslavia under-21 international footballers
HNK Hajduk Split players
NK Marsonia players
FK Vojvodina players
Lierse S.K. players
Yugoslav First League players
Belgian Pro League players
Yugoslav expatriate footballers
Expatriate footballers in Belgium
Yugoslav expatriate sportspeople in Belgium
Croatian football managers
NK Marsonia managers
HŠK Posušje managers
Croatian expatriate football managers
Expatriate football managers in Bosnia and Herzegovina
Croatian expatriate sportspeople in Bosnia and Herzegovina